Stephen Timothy Maar (born 6 December 1994) is a Canadian volleyball player, member of the Canada men's national volleyball team and Italian club Allianz Milano.

Career

National team
In June 2021, Maar was named to Canada's 2020 Olympic team.

Sporting achievements

College
 National championships
 2015/2016  CIS Championship, with McMaster Marauders

Clubs
 CEV Challenge Cup
  2020/2021 – with Allianz Powervolley Milano

Individual awards
 2015: Pan American Cup – Best Spiker
 2015: Pan American Cup – Best Outside Spiker
 2016: CIS Championship – Tournament All-Stars
 2017: NORCECA Championship – Best Outside Spiker
 2019: NORCECA Championship – Best Outside Spiker

References

External links
 
 
 Player profile at Volleybox.net
 McMaster Marauders 2015–16 Roster – Stephen Maar
 2017 FIVB World League – Team Canada

1994 births
Living people
Sportspeople from Aurora, Ontario
Canadian men's volleyball players
Canadian expatriate sportspeople in Italy
Expatriate volleyball players in Italy
Canadian expatriate sportspeople in Russia
Expatriate volleyball players in Russia
Blu Volley Verona players
Power Volley Milano players
Volleyball players at the 2020 Summer Olympics
Outside hitters
Olympic volleyball players of Canada